OakNorth Bank is a UK bank for scaling businesses (typically with between £1m-£100m in turnover) that provides loans and both business and personal savings accounts. The bank, which gained regulatory approval in early 2015, was founded by entrepreneurs Rishi Khosla and Joel Perlman, who had previously founded Copal Amba. The bank focuses on providing loans of £0.5m-£25m, as well as a range of savings accounts.

In 2020, Financial Times ranked the company at #1 on their list FT 1000: Europe's Fastest Growing Companies 2020. In 2022, OakNorth Bank reported an increase in pre-tax profits of 73% to £134.5m.

History 
OakNorth Bank secured a full banking licence from the Prudential Regulation Authority (PRA) and the Financial Conduct Authority (FCA) in March 2015 and launched offering fast, flexible debt financing and a range of savings accounts, six months later in September 2015.

The Board is chaired by Cyrus Ardalan, former vice-Chairman of public policy and government relations at Barclays Bank, and includes Harvard Business School faculty member and an ex-managing director of Bain Capital Edward “Ted” Berk and Robert Burgess. In February 2021, Rajesh Gupta, formerly CFO at Kensington Mortgages, joined OakNorth Bank as its CFO. OakNorth Bank also appointed Carolyn Schuetz, former Chief Operating Officer for Group Retail Banking at HSBC, and Timo Boldt, co-founder of Gousto, as Non-Executive Directors in July 2021 and August 2022 respectively.

Lord Adair Turner, the former Chairman of the Financial Services Authority (now the Financial Conduct Authority) joined the bank's advisory board in May 2017 after previously holding the role of senior independent advisor on the OakNorth Bank board from 2015. He was joined in October 2018 by Martin Stewart, the former Director of Banks, Building Societies & Credit Unions at the Bank of England. In January 2020, Philip Hammond, the former UK Chancellor, became the latest member to join OakNorth's Advisory Board.

In May 2016, OakNorth became the first bank to be fully hosted on the cloud after working with Amazon Web Services (AWS) to drive the development forward with the regulator.

In June 2021, OakNorth launched the ‘Mentorpreneurship' programme in partnership with the London School of Economics. The programme is the first university-run initiative of its kind and has been designed to support the development of socially conscious start-ups and inspire entrepreneurial thinking, by focusing on the fundamental role of mentorship in business. 

In December 2021, OakNorth completed its first acquisition with a 100% takeover of accountancy cash flow provider, Fluidly. In October 2022, OakNorth Bank acquired a 50% stake in specialist property lenders ASK Partners, to deepen its support for UK housebuilders and property entrepreneurs.

Operations 
OakNorth Bank has offices in London and Manchester as well as regional hubs in Birmingham, Bristol, Leeds and East Anglia. It also has India-based front-office, customer-facing teams in Bengaluru, Gurugram and Hyderabad.

Loans 
Since its launch, OakNorth Bank has lent over £8.5b, to businesses across the UK and across multiple sectors. 

OakNorth Bank has provided loans to several household names including: Leon Restaurants, Raymond Blanc’s Brasserie Blanc, and Yotam Ottolenghi’s eponymous restaurant and deli chain.  Outside of restaurant businesses, other high profile names that OakNorth Bank has funded include Deliciously Ella, Z Hotels, Arora Group, Staycity and Inception Group.

Savings 
OakNorth Bank offers a range of award winning savings accounts for both businesses and personal use, including: fixed term savings accounts, notice accounts and easy access accounts, as well as fixed rate and easy access cash ISAs. OakNorth Bank’s savings accounts can be managed online and via its mobile app.

Awards 
In 2020, OakNorth Bank won:

 MoneyComms Best Internet Savings Provider and was Highly Recommended for Best Internet Account Provider at the Moneyfacts Awards.

OakNorth Bank also ranked first in the FT1000 list for 2020. 

In 2021, OakNorth Bank won:

 Credit Team of the Year at the MoneyAge National Credit Awards. 
 Senior Housing Capital Partner at the HealthInvestor Seniors Housing Awards. 
 The ‘Investment Award’ category at The Estates Gazette Tech Awards.

In 2022, OakNorth Bank won:

 The ‘Professional Services – Finance’ category at TheBusinessDesk’s Business Masters Awards in Yorkshire, East Midlands and West Midlands.
 The ‘Alternative Finance Provider of the Year’ and ‘Private Equity/Venture Capital Deal of the Year’ awards at the Insider Media Central & East Dealmakers Awards. 

OakNorth Bank was also named in Deloitte’s UK Technology Fast 50 list for 2022.

References 

Banks based in the City of London
British companies established in 2015